The 1980 Castrol International Rally was the seventh running of the Castrol International Rally. The rally took place between the 22nd and the 23rd of March 1980. The event was based in Canberra and covered 600 kilometres in 43 Special Stages.  It was won by Greg Carr and Fred Gocentas, driving a Ford Escort RS 1800 Mark II.

Results

References

Rally competitions in Australia
Castrol International Rally